Adimakal Udamakal is a 1987 Indian Malayalam-language political film directed by I. V. Sasi and written by T. Damodaran, starring Mammootty, Mohanlal, Nalini and Seema. Ratheesh, Mukesh, Urvashi, Jagathi Sreekumar, Captain Raju, Lissy, Sukumari and Santhakumari plays supporting roles.

Plot 
It is a political film on trade union and its functioning in factories. Trade Union is headed by Raghavan (Mammootty). Mill Owner brings new manager Mohan Cheriyan (Mohanlal) to solve the company's issues with trade union leaders. Meanwhile, Indu, Mill Owner's sister is attracted to Mohan. Nexus between politicians and factory owners dumping workers for their selfish deeds is also highlighted. When the company is about to lay off due to union problems, Raghavan suggests a new formula for solving the company issues and this saves the company. The issue is resolved. However many union members turn against Raghavan. During the climax, chaos breaks out and Raghavan is killed by his own union members who despise him. Mohan is seen holding cloth covered in Raghavan's blood symbolizing Communist flag(red) and idea of "blood and sweat".

Cast 

Mammootty as Raghavan, the union leader
Mohanlal as Mohan Cheriyan, the manager
Nalini as Devootty
Seema as Radha
Urvashi as Indhu
Ratheesh as Sukumaran
Balan K. Nair as Karunakaran Nambiar
K. P. Ummer as Andrews
Jagathi Sreekumar as Mukundan
Lizy  Raji
Thilakan as Gopalan
Sankaradi as Govindan
Mukesh  Jayan
Captain Raju  Sathyan
Mamukkoya as Pocker
Janardhanan as Ramachandran
Sukumari as Janu
Devan as Vijayan
Valsala Menon as Madhavi
Kundara Johny as Joseph
Jagannatha Varma as R. K. Shenoy
Santhakumari as Sarada
T. P. Madhavan as Minister
 Augustine as Abootty

Release 
The film was released on 10 April 1987 and was a commercial success.

References

External links 
 

1980s Malayalam-language films
1987 films
Indian political films
Films directed by I. V. Sasi